Radio Feniks is a Bosnian local commercial radio station, broadcasting from Bosanska Dubica/Kozarska Dubica, Bosnia and Herzegovina.

This radio station broadcasts a variety of programs such as music, talk show and local news.

The owner of the radio station is the company FENIKS-ALFA d.o.o. Kozarska Dubica.

Radio Feniks was founded on 6 May 1997 in Prijedor, where it operated until 22 February 2002 after which radio station was relocated to current location in Bosanska Dubica/Kozarska Dubica.

Program is mainly produced in Serbian language at one FM frequency (Bosanska Dubica/Kozarska Dubica  ) and it is available in the Bosanska Dubica/Kozarska Dubica area and in neighboring Croatia.

Estimated number of listeners of Radio Feniks is around 17.129.

Frequencies
 Bosanska Dubica/Kozarska Dubica

See also 
 List of radio stations in Bosnia and Herzegovina
 Dub Radio
 Radio Gradiška
 DiV Radio
 Radio Kontakt
 Free Radio Prijedor

References

External links 
 www.radiofeniks.com
  www.radiostanica.ba
 Communications Regulatory Agency of Bosnia and Herzegovina

Kozarska Dubica
Radio stations established in 1997
Dubica, Bosnia and Herzegovina